The 1966 County Championship was the 67th officially organised running of the County Championship. Yorkshire won the Championship title.

The method of obtaining points for the first innings was changed with two points awarded for a first innings lead for any match won, lost or drawn.

Table
10 points for a win
5 points to each side for a tie
5 points to side still batting in a match in which scores finish level
2 points for first innings lead
1 point for first innings tie
If no play possible on the first two days, and the match does not go into the second innings, the side leading on first innings scores 6 points. If the scores are level, the side batting second scores 3 points.
Position determined by points gained. If equal, then decided on most wins.
Each team plays 28 matches.
The first innings in the first 102 matches of the season (first 12 games played by each county on a home and away basis) was restricted to 65 overs. Normal conditions applied to return matches or when sides met only once in the season.

References

1966 in English cricket
County Championship seasons